Glee music may refer to:

 Glee (music), an English type of song music
 Music from Glee (TV series), a U.S. TV series 
 List of songs in Glee (season 1)
 List of songs in Glee (season 2)
 List of songs in Glee (season 3)
 List of songs in Glee (season 4)
 List of songs in Glee (season 5)
 List of songs in Glee (season 6)
 Glee discography
 Glee (Bran Van 3000 album)
 Glee (Logan Lynn album)